Tinpot Island is a small island classified as a conservation area within Norfolk Bay, Tasmania.

References

Islands of Tasmania
Islands of Australia (tenure: conservation area)